Robert Gordon (born May 22, 1944) is a clinical psychologist, forensic psychologist, and attorney from Texas. His company, Wilmington Institute Network (WIN), specializes in the alternative dispute resolution (ADR), focusing on use of Internet in conflict resolution.

He is a member of Texas Psychological Association.

Education
Gordon earned his B.S. in psychology from the University of Wisconsin–Madison (1966); his M.S. in psychology from the University of Oklahoma (1967); his Ph.D. in psychology from the University of Oklahoma (1968). In 1971, after obtaining his J.D. from Baylor Law School and passing the Texas bar exam, Gordon began work in Dallas and Houston. He was also teaching at Southern Methodist University.

Publications
Gordon is the author of the notable publication "The Electronic Personality and Digital Self" (Dispute Resolution Journal, February/April 2001). Examples of his other works are  
"Ready for ADR?" (For the Defense, March 2001) and "Reducing Trial and ADR Risks Through Empirical Research" (The Trial Lawyer, July/August 2001).

References

External links
 http://forsci.net
 http://insightandanswers.com
 http://www.gordonpoll.com
 http://www.likablewitness.com
 http://www.virtualjury.com
 http://www.winthecase.com

Forensic psychologists
 University of Wisconsin–Madison College of Letters and Science alumni
1944 births
Living people